Nanuya Lailai  is an island of the Yasawa Group in Fiji. It is located north of Nanuya Levu, which served as a location for the film The Blue Lagoon, separated by a narrow channel.

A beach on the west of the island is leased by Blue Lagoon Cruises, nearby is the island's one luxury resort. The small settlement of Enendala is at the base of a hill on the island's eastern beach. Seven families, all related and with family connections to Naisisili Village on Nacula Island, live there. They operate a small number of backpacker hostels.

References

 Cross theory - Fiji Times Online
 Fiji: a slice of paradise that doesn't break the bank
 Los Angeles Times: Archives - Grass Skirts A-Go-Go in Fetching Fiji

Ba Province
Islands of Fiji
Yasawa Islands